K46 may refer to:

 K-46 (Kansas highway)
 K-46 (1927), now part of U.S. Route 160
 Blair Municipal Airport, in Washington County, Nebraska
 BMW K46, a German sport bike
 Furuse Station, in Hokkaido, Japan
 , a Flower-class corvette of the Royal Navy
 , a Veer-class corvette of the Indian Navy
 Potassium-46, an isotope of potassium